"I Love It" is a song by American rappers Kanye West and Lil Pump, featuring guest vocals by American comedian Adele Givens, using snippets from her 1992 episode of Def Comedy Jam. The song was produced by West alongside DJ Clark Kent and frequent Lil Pump collaborator CBMix, with additional production by Ronny J. The song premiered at the 2018 Pornhub Awards. "I Love It" reached number one in Canada, Finland, New Zealand and Sweden, as well as the top 10 in Australia, the United Kingdom and the United States. The song is the third single from Lil Pump's second studio album, Harverd Dropout (2019).

Background and release
Kanye West was the creative director of the inaugural Pornhub Awards on September 6, 2018. After a live performance with Teyana Taylor, West later premiered the music video for his new song with Lil Pump. West raps in a sexually explicit way in it that mirrors how he performed in the songs "I'm In It" and "XTCY".

A remix with GOOD Music signee Valee has also been recorded but has yet to be released. An edited version of the song known as "I Love It (Freaky Girl Edit)" was released to the iTunes Store on September 7, 2018, which West and Pump performed live on Saturday Night Live on September 29. The song was originally intended to be on West's ninth studio album Yandhi shortly after the performance, but the album suffered from multiple delays and was eventually scrapped. When Pump shared the track list for his second studio album Harverd Dropout on February 19, 2019, "I Love It" was shown to be the album's third track.

Artwork
The artwork was painted by Shadi Al-Atallah, who also painted the artwork for West's previous single "XTCY". West asked Al-Atallah to paint the artwork using a color scheme inspired by a Kerry James Marshall painting.

Reception
The song was panned by music critics. Sheldon Pearce of Pitchfork described everything about it as what "feels like it belongs in a "Saturday Night Live" sketch about [West] that got cut". West later expressed regret over making the track, stating in an interview with Big Boy's Neighborhood: "Oh, I bet you The Devil was happy on that day."

Controversy
On September 13, 2018, DJ David Morales accused West of stealing the bass line of "I Love It" from his remix to Alexander O'Neal's song "What Is This Thing Called Love?".

West's ex-girlfriend Amber Rose posted to her Instagram on September 18 to accuse him and Pump of being inspired by her SlutWalk movement for the track, yet giving no credit.

Music video

A music video for the single was premiered at the 2018 Pornhub Awards. West and Lil Pump wear giant, rectangular body suits reminiscent of characters from the video game platform Roblox as they walk down a hallway  lined with women covered in mesh cloth posing as statues. The women statues can be seen moving, breathing, and shifting throughout the video. The video was executive-produced by Spike Jonze and directed by West and Amanda Adelson. Shortly after the release, Jonze revealed the early sketches for it. The music video garnered 76 million views globally in its first week surpassing "This Is America" by Childish Gambino as the biggest opening week on YouTube for a hip-hop video. Soon after its release, the video became a popular internet meme.

Commercial performance
In the United States, the song debuted at number six on the US Billboard Hot 100, making it Kanye West's 17th top-ten song and Lil Pump's second top ten on the chart. On May 16, 2019, "I Love It" was certified double Platinum by the Recording Industry Association of America (RIAA) for selling over two million units in the United States.

In the United Kingdom, "I Love It" debuted at number three on the UK Singles Chart. It serves as Kanye West's first single to reach the top five since 2015 collaboration "FourFiveSeconds" with Rihanna and Paul McCartney, as well as his 19th top-ten song and Lil Pump's very first top ten on the chart. The single was certified Gold in the UK on December 14, 2018, by the British Phonographic Industry (BPI).

In Canada, the song debuted at number one on the Canadian Hot 100, making it West's third and Lil Pump's first number-one single.

Track listings
 Digital download
 "I Love It" – 2:08
 Digital download
 "I Love It" (Freaky Girl) (Edit) – 2:08

Credits and personnel
Credits adapted from Tidal.
 Kanye West – production, vocals
 Lil Pump – vocals
 Smokepurpp – writer
 DJ Clark Kent – production
 CBMix – production
 Ronny J – additional production
 Zack Djurich – engineering
 Mike Dean – mixing
 Jess Jackson – mixing

Charts

Weekly charts

Year-end charts

Certifications

Release history

See also
 List of top 10 singles in 2018 (Australia)
 List of Canadian Hot 100 number-one singles of 2018
 List of number-one singles and albums in Sweden
 List of UK R&B Singles Chart number ones of 2018
 List of UK top-ten singles in 2018
 List of Billboard Hot 100 top-ten singles in 2018

References

External links
 "I Love It" Lyrics at Billboard

2018 singles
2018 songs
Canadian Hot 100 number-one singles
Dirty rap songs
Internet memes introduced in 2018
Kanye West songs
Lil Pump songs
Songs involved in plagiarism controversies
Number-one singles in Finland
Number-one singles in New Zealand
Number-one singles in Sweden
Song recordings produced by Kanye West
Songs written by Kanye West
Songs written by Lil Pump
Comedy rap songs
Song recordings produced by Ronny J
Songs written by Smokepurpp